The 1892–93 season was Northwich Victoria's first season in the Football League. They competed in the newly formed 12 team Football League Second Division, for which they were a founding member. The league was then the second tier of English football, where they finished in seventh-place.

Season synopsis
The season began on 3 September 1892, when Northwich played Grimsby Town, losing 2–1. Losing a further two games, it was not until 24 September when Northwich gained their first points in a 1–1 draw at Manchester City.

Table

FA Cup results

References

 
 
 

Northwich Victoria F.C. seasons
Northwich Victoria